The 2014–15 Croatian First Football League (officially known as the MAXtv Prva Liga for sponsorship reasons) was the 24th season of the Croatian First Football League, the national championship for men's association football teams in Croatia, since its establishment in 1992. The season started on 18 July 2014 and ended on 30 May 2015.

The league was contested by 10 teams. Dinamo Zagreb were the defending champions, having won their ninth consecutive title in 2013–14.

Teams
The following is a complete list of teams who will contest the 2014–15 Prva HNL.

Stadia and locations

Personnel and kits

Managerial changes

League table

Results

First round

Second round

Relegation play-off
At the end of season, ninth placed Istra 1961 qualified for a home and away relegation playoff tie against Sesvete, runners-up of the 2014–15 Croatian Second Football League. However, Sesvete's managing board decided not to contest the tie, as their home stadium in Sesvete failed to get a licence for top-level football. As the club also refused to use Maksimir Stadium as a replacement venue for hosting home games, Istra 1961 automatically avoided relegation and qualified for 2015–16 Croatian First Football League.

Top goalscorers
As of 31 May 2015; Source: Croatian Football Statistics UEFA.com

Awards

Annual awards

See also
2014–15 Croatian Second Football League
2014–15 Croatian Football Cup

References

External links
Official website 
Prva HNL at UEFA.com

2014-15
Cro
1